The 1926 Hartford Blues season was their only season in the league. The team finished 3–7, finishing thirteenth in the league.

Schedule

Roster

Standings

References

Hartford Blues seasons
Hartford Blues